Hynobius quelpaertensis, the Jeju salamander, also spelled Cheju salamander, is a species of salamander found on various islands and peninsulas off the southwestern coast of the Korean Peninsula, including Jindo, Geojedo, Jejudo, and Namhae. It inhabits moist mountain forests.

Jeju salamanders are speckled brown in color. Males are also distinguished by their thick front legs and black coloration on their backs. This species mates from March to late April, laying eggs under small rocks and leaves in mountain pools.

The Jeju salamander was previously considered a subspecies of the Korean salamander, and was classified as Hynobius leechii quelpaertensis.

See also
List of amphibians of Korea
Korean salamander

References

quelpaertensis
Amphibians of Korea
Endemic fauna of Korea
Amphibians described in 1928